The Myrtle Beach Invitational is a preseason college basketball tournament owned and operated by ESPN Regional Television that takes place in late November of each year, usually the week before Thanksgiving.

The tournament had its inaugural run in 2018.

Tournament History

Champions

Brackets 
* – Denotes overtime period

2022 
The 2022 tournament took place at HTC Center in Conway, South Carolina from November 17–20, 2022.

Game recaps:

2021

2019

2018

References

External links 
Official site of the Myrtle Beach Invitational

College men's basketball competitions in the United States
College basketball competitions
Recurring sporting events established in 2018
Basketball in South Carolina
Sports in Myrtle Beach, South Carolina